Gregory John Gutfeld (born September 12, 1964) is an American television host, libertarian political commentator, comedian, and author. He is the host of the late-night comedy talk show Gutfeld!, and hosted a Saturday night edition of Gutfeld! called The Greg Gutfeld Show from May 2015 until March 2021, when it was announced the show would transition to weeknights. Gutfeld is also one of five co-hosts and panelists on the political talk show The Five. Both of his shows air on the Fox News Channel. From 2007 to 2015, Gutfeld hosted the 3AM series Red Eye, a late-night talk show that also aired on the Fox News Channel.

Early life and education
Gutfeld was born in San Mateo, California, the son of Jacqueline Bernice "Jackie" (née Cauhape) and Alfred Jack Gutfeld. Raised Catholic, he attended the all-boys Roman Catholic Junípero Serra High School and the University of California, Berkeley, graduating in 1987 with a bachelor's degree in English.

In a 2009 interview, Gutfeld explained that he started to experience a change in his political thinking while he was attending college:

Career
After college, Gutfeld interned at The American Spectator, as an assistant to conservative writer R. Emmett Tyrrell. He then worked as a staff writer at Prevention magazine and as an editor for various Rodale Press magazines. In 1995, he became a staff writer at Men's Health. He was promoted to editor-in-chief of Men's Health in 1999. A year later, he was replaced by David Zinczenko.

Gutfeld then became editor-in-chief of Stuff, then owned by Dennis Publishing. During his tenure, circulation increased from 750,000 to 1.2 million. In 2003, Gutfeld hired several dwarfs to attend a conference of the Magazine Publishers of America on the topic of "buzz", with instructions to be as loud and annoying as possible. The stunt generated publicity but led to Gutfeld being fired soon afterward; he then became head of "brain development" at Dennis Publishing. He edited the company's Maxim magazine in the U.K. from 2004 to 2006. Gutfeld's contract expired without renewal after losses in readership under his tenure.

Gutfeld was one of the first posting contributors to The Huffington Post, from its launch in 2005 until October 2008. Frequent targets of his commentaries included Huffington Post colleagues Deepak Chopra, Cenk Uygur, and Arianna Huffington.

Beginning on February 5, 2007, Gutfeld served as host of the late-night talk show Red Eye on the Fox News Channel. The hour-long show initially aired at 2:00 A.M. ET Monday through Saturday mornings and at 11:00 P.M. on Saturday evenings. However, beginning in October 2007, the show began airing at 3:00 A.M. Monday through Saturday mornings while retaining its 11:00 P.M timeslot on Saturday evenings. From 2007 to 2013, Bill Schulz served as Gutfeld's sidekick, and Andy Levy served as the show's ombudsman. Schulz had been Gutfeld's colleague at Stuff magazine, and Levy was a fellow blogger at The Huffington Post. On July 11, 2011, Gutfeld became a co-host and panelist on the Fox News political talk show The Five, which airs weekdays at 5:00 P.M. ET. Gutfeld left Red Eye in February 2015, with Tom Shillue succeeding him as host of the program. On May 31, 2015, Gutfeld began hosting a new weekly late-night talk show on Fox News called The Greg Gutfeld Show; which aired at 10:00 P.M. ET on Saturdays. In February 2021, it was announced that, beginning in the second quarter, the show would move to weeknights at 11:00 P.M. ET. On March 10, 2021, it was announced that the new weeknight show would be called Gutfeld! and premiere on April 5. In August 2021, Gutfeld!  overtook The Late Show with Stephen Colbert in the nightly ratings, becoming the highest-rated late-night talk show in the United States. It averaged 2.12 million nightly viewers, more than The Late Show, The Tonight Show Starring Jimmy Fallon, and Jimmy Kimmel Live!.

By the end of 2021, the combined viewership for Gutfeld! and The Five averaged over five million viewers.

Gutfeld has appeared as a guest on Coffee with Scott Adams and The Adam Carolla Show.

Recognition
In late 2021, Gutfeld was named the 12th-most influential person in American media by the Mediaite website.

Controversies

Apology to Canadians
During a Red Eye segment that aired on March 17, 2009, Gutfeld and his panel discussed Canadian Lieutenant General Andrew Leslie's statement that the Canadian Armed Forces may require a one-year "synchronized break" once Canada's mission in Afghanistan ended in 2011: "Meaning, the Canadian military wants to take a breather to do some yoga, paint landscapes, run on the beach in gorgeous white Capri pants." The comedian panelist Doug Benson added: "I didn't even know they were in the war.... I thought that's where you go if you don't want to fight. Go chill in Canada." Gutfeld also said: "Isn't this the perfect time to invade this ridiculous country? They have no army!"

The segment was posted to YouTube three days after the reported deaths of four Canadian soldiers in Afghanistan, prompting widespread outrage. Canada had then been in command of the NATO mission in Kandahar Province, the birthplace and former capital of the Taliban, for three years. Along with Helmand Province, it was "home to some of the fiercest opposition to coalition forces" and reported to "have the highest casualty rates per province."

Canadian Defence Minister Peter MacKay called on Fox to apologize for the satirical comments and described the remarks as "despicable, hurtful and ignorant." Gutfeld, while maintaining that the show is satirical and irreverent, offered the following apology: "The March 17 episode of Red Eye included a segment discussing Canada's plan for a 'synchronized break,' which was in no way an attempt to make light of troop efforts. However, I realize that my words may have been misunderstood. It was not my intent to disrespect the brave men, women, and families of the Canadian military, and for that, I apologize."

Russia's invasion of Ukraine 
After Russia invaded Ukraine in 2022, Gutfeld said that the media were emotionally manipulating viewers with footage from the conflict "...because that makes a profit for news companies." Gutfeld was rebuked by Fox News foreign affairs correspondent Benjamin Hall who was on the ground in Kyiv: "This is not the media trying to drum up some emotional response. This is absolutely what’s happening." A few days later, Hall was seriously injured, while Pierre Zakrzewski (who also works for Fox) and a Ukrainian journalist were killed, in a surprise attack on the journalists by Russian forces. Gutfeld's mother-in-law, the mother of Elena Gutfeld, was also evacuated from Ukraine due to the efforts of Fox News colleagues Steve Brannigan and Lucas Tomlinson.

Personal life
Gutfeld thought he voted by mail in the 2016 presidential election, but The Washington Post could find no evidence in voting records. Gutfeld thinks it was possible that he missed the official deadline.

, Gutfeld resides in New York City with his Russian wife, Elena Moussa. He met the photo editor in London, where he lived for three years.

Gutfeld was raised Roman Catholic and served as an altar boy. He describes himself as an "agnostic atheist".

A fan of hard rock and heavy metal music, Gutfeld has spoken on-air about being a fan of many bands, including Power Trip. Gutfeld paid tribute to Power Trip's singer Riley Gale after his death in 2020.

Gutfeld is also a self-described libertarian.

Books

See also
 New Yorkers in journalism

References

Sources

External links

 Official website
 Gutfeld! at Fox News Channel
 Greg Gutfeld archives at The Huffington Post
 Red Eye w/ Greg Gutfeld at Fox News Channel
 
 
 The Daily Gut (blog site)
 

1964 births
21st-century American writers
American agnostics
American male bloggers
American bloggers
American comedians
American humorists
American libertarians
American magazine editors
American male writers
American political commentators
American political writers
American television journalists
Former Roman Catholics
Fox News people
Living people
Members of the Libertarian Party (United States)
Men's Health (magazine)
People from San Mateo, California
The American Spectator people
HuffPost writers and columnists
University of California, Berkeley alumni
Writers from California
Writers from New York City
Junípero Serra High School (San Mateo, California) alumni